Thuggee: Banditry and the British in early nineteenth-century India (2007), is a book authored by Kim A. Wagner and published by Palgrave Macmillan, which was short-listed for the History Today Book of the Year Award in 2008.

References

External links
Thuggee: Banditry and the British in Early Nineteenth-Century India

2007 non-fiction books
History books about India
21st-century history books